Ryosuke Fukamachi (born October 25, 1984) appeared in one game for the Yomiuri Giants of Nippon Professional Baseball in 2007, allowing two earned runs and posting a 54.00 ERA in 1/3 of an inning. He batted and threw right handed, attended Chukyodai Chukyo High School and then Chukyo University. He was born in Nagoya, Aichi, Japan.

References

1984 births
Yomiuri Giants players
Baseball people from Nagoya
Japanese baseball players
Nippon Professional Baseball pitchers
Baseball pitchers
Living people